Barry David Robinson (22 February 1932 – 16 January 2019) was an English cricketer.  Robinson was a right-handed batsman.  He was born in Luton, Bedfordshire.

Robinson made his debut for Bedfordshire against Cambridgeshire in the 1957 Minor Counties Championship.  He played Minor counties cricket for Bedfordshire from 1957 to 1973, making 72 Minor Counties Championship appearances.  He made his List A debut against Dorset in the 1968 Gillette Cup.  In this match he wasn't required to bat, with Dorset winning by 8 wickets.  He made a further List A appearance in the 2nd round of the same competition against Hampshire.  He scored 8 runs in this match, before being dismissed by Butch White.  Bedfordshire lost by 124 runs.

References

External links

1932 births
2019 deaths
Cricketers from Luton
English cricketers
Bedfordshire cricketers